Mn/Al-azhar M.V is a Muslim school located in the Mannar District, in Northern Province, Sri Lanka.

References

Azharianz

Provincial schools in Sri Lanka
Schools in Mannar District